The Japanese American Evacuation and Resettlement Study (JERS) was a research project at the University of California, Berkeley in 1942. The goal of the research project was to examine the mass internment of Japanese Americans via selected Nisei social students from the campus. It was an academic study on the migration, confinement, and resettlement of Japanese Americans during World War II.

It aimed to document and examine the mass internment of Japanese Americans by embedding Nisei social science students recruited from the Berkeley campus into selected internment sites. The study also documented the resettlement phase in the city of Chicago. The collection consists of daily journals, field reports, life histories, and secondary research materials collected and compiled by the research staff. There is also extensive correspondence between staff, evacuees, and others. These records were deposited in the University Library in August 1948 by sociologist and Director of JERS, Dorothy Swaine Thomas.

The JERS staff concentrated on Tule Lake, Gila River, and Poston/Colorado River, with minor involvement at Topaz/Central Utah, Manzanar, and Minidoka. Material was also gathered from temporary detention centers, primarily the Tanforan and Tulare centers located in California.

References

External links
 Photographs of the Japanese-American evacuation from Berkeley, Calif. [graphic], The Bancroft Library

Internment of Japanese Americans
University of California, Berkeley